Adanero is a municipality of Spain located in the province of Ávila, Castile and León. The municipality has a total area of 31.42 km2 and, as of 1 January 2019, a registered population of 196, according to the INE.

History 
Adanero was granted the privilege of town (villa) in 1630, during the reign of Philip IV, becoming independent from the land of Ávila.

References
Citations

Bibliography
 

Municipalities in the Province of Ávila